Malé Ripňany is a municipality in the Topoľčany District of the Nitra Region, Slovakia. In 2011 it had 547 inhabitants.

References

External links
Malé Ripňany - Okres Topoľčany - E-OBCE.sk
Official homepage

Villages and municipalities in Topoľčany District